Since opening in 1968, the art gallery at Peel Art Gallery, Museum and Archives has exhibited local, national, and international artists, both contemporary and historical from their permanent collection.

The institution has previously been known as the Peel Museum and Art Gallery and the Art Gallery of Peel.

1960s

1970s
 Andy Donato (1977)

1980s
 In 1981: Adrian Van Den Brekel, a former member of Brampton's Group '59.
 juried art show
 Award of Distinction: Vallery Mokrytzki
 In September 1984: William Perkins Bull collection
 Keith Moreau (1984)
 Juried art show
 Honourable Mention: Kreso Cavlovic

The Art Gallery of Peel moved to the adjacent Registry Office building in 1985.
 Colour and Form Society (1985)
 Shaped Panels and Coloured Works by Ronald Bloore (1985)
 Ronald Bloore, Recent Paintings (1985)
 John Meredith (1986)
 Gold Mine '89 (December 6, 1989)
 Visual Arts Brampton hosted a silent art auction, with funds raised going to their group and the Peel Gallery Volunteer Group. The show was opened by Ontario Premier William G. Davis.

1990s
 Gordon Rayner (1990)
 Juried art show (1990)
 PGVG Award: Kreso Cavlovic
 Raynerart (November 1990)
 Included artwork by Stephanie Rayner.
 Continuum, O. G.
 Included Vallery Mokrytzki.
 Juried art show (1991)
 Juror's Award: K. Woodman
 People's Choice Award: Stephanie Rayner
 Jim Reid (1992)
 Contemporary Prints in Peel (1994)
 Recent Acquisitions (August 1995)
 Included work by Stephanie Rayner.
 As of November 1995: Phillip Coman, Nathalie Ross
 As of November and December 1996: Chris Cran
 Unidentified group show (1997)
 Included was Sheri Tenaglia.
 juried show
 Juror was Stephanie Rayner.
 juried show
 People's Choice Award: William Lazos
 Smokin' (1998)
 Solo exhibit by John Armstrong.
 As of January and February 1999: Visible '99: a celebration of Black History Month
 Sadko Hadzihasanovic
 Catalogue, essay by Gary Michael Dault.

2000s
 Thirty-two Years of Collecting (June 28 – August 27, 2000) Gallery 1
 Robin Hesse: Nightscapes (June 28 – August) Gallery 2 and 3
 Mike Hansen: Structures (September 7 – November 5, 2000)
 Clarissa Schmidt Inglis: Twenty-one Years (November 15 – January 14, 2001)
 Towards a Meaningful Expression: Watercolours by Neville Clarke (January 24 – March 25, 2001)
 28th Annual Juried Exhibition (April 19 – June 3, 2001)
 Patrick Sibbald (May 18 to July 15, 2001) May not have been exhibited.
 Student Juried Exhibition (June 4–17, 2001 (closing date may be extended))
 Fairy Tales for Grown-ups: The Photographs of Diane Arbus (July 5 – August 12, 2001)
 Aspects of the Collection (August 22 -September 9, 2001)
 Capturing the Moment: Photographs by Russell K. Cooper (until September 29, 2001)
 John Anderson (October 9 – November 17, 2001)
 Suburbia (December 3, 2001 – January 26, 2002) Works by Glen Priestley, Doug Kirton, Eric Fischl, Susan Dobson, Jaclyn Shoub, Gary Evans and John Armstrong.
 Peel Artists: Henry Jerome and Jiri Ustohal (February 6 – March 31, 2002)
 Annual Juried Exhibition (April 20 – May 26, 2002)
 Student Juried Exhibition (June 3–16, 2002)
 It's in the mail... (June 26 – August 18, 2002) An exhibition of international mail art.
 Pat Clemes: Watercolours (August 28 – October 13, 2002)
 Images of War (October 23 – January 19, 2003)
 Images of War (October 23, 2002 – February 16, 2003)
 Aspects of the Collection: New Acquisitions (February 26 – April 13, 2003)
 30th Annual Juried Show (April 30 – June 1, 2003)
 8th Annual Student Juried Exhibition (June 5–23, 2003)
 Kris Rosar: Domestic Possessions/Obsessions and Denise Macharacek: Cake & Bread (July 2 – August 31, 2003)
 Peel Artists: Janet Baker and Mary Ellen Farrow (September 10 – October 26, 2003)
 Canadian Society of Painters in Watercolour (November 5, 2003 – January 18, 2004)
 Michael Chambers: Visible (10 January – 8 February 2004)
 Peel Artists: Peter Locke, Cecilia Yu Park and Christine Lynett (18 February – 28 March 2004)
 31st Annual Juried Show (14 April – 30 May 2004)
 Annual Student Juried Show (7–20 June 2004)
 Garden of Delights (7 July – 5 September 2004) Originally titled Mary Hecht: Sculpture
 Out of Hand: The Life and Times of Rural Water (15 September – 24 October 2004)
 Painted in Peel: The Peel Landscape by the Group of Seven and their Contemporaries (3 November 2004 – 2 January 2005)
 Tribute: The Art of African Canadians (January 12 – February 27, 2005)
 Peel Artists: Marlene Madole and Margaret Squire (March 9 – April 10, 2005)
 32nd Annual Juried Show of Fine Art (April 27 – May 29, 2005)
 Annual Student Curated Exhibition (June 8–24, 2005)
 Today's Hits and Yesterday's Classics: Selections from the Permanent Collection (July 6 – September 4, 2005)
 Sydney Drum: New Work (September 14 – Oct. 23, 2005)
 Harold Klunder: Montreal Paintings and Prints (November 2, 2005 – Jan. 1, 2006)
 juried art show (2007)
 Juror's Choice Award: Shamsi Shahrokhi
 Heritage Complex (2008)
 Curated by Tejpal Ajii. Artists include Corin Sworn.
 Jordan Broadworth, Paintings (2008)
 Catalog by Daniel Baird.
 Presences Through Absence (September 9 to October 18, 2009)
 Included artwork by Scott Chandler. Opening on Sunday, September 13, 2 to 4 pm.
 juried art show (2009)
 Juror: Lyn Carter

2010s
 Day in and Day out with Minor Tragedies (Oct.28 – Jan. 3, 2010)
 International multimedia artist Wyn Geleynse. Included the installation Wyn Geleynse: The Peel Projection
 Wresting Vision, Conjuring Place (Jan. 17 through Feb. 28, 2010)
 Montreal artist Michael Smith, and locally based Mississauga artist Claudio Ghirardo

References

Culture of Brampton